The Salem Gazette is an American newspaper serving Salem residents. The weekly newspaper comes out on Fridays. The Salem Gazette, first published on January 5, 1790, used to be known as the Salem Mercury, and briefly The American Eagle. The first issue of the Salem Gazette is technically the only issue of The American Eagle published.

Thomas C. Cushing was the original publisher of the Salem Gazette, however he relinquished the publication to William Carleton on October 14, 1794. The next issue of the Gazette contains a few words from the new publisher, and a special section from Rev. William Bentley, an outspoken columnist known at the time for his eccentric, but unspotted character in writing.

In June, 1796, the Gazette was published as a semi-weekly paper, on Tuesday and Friday.

On July 25, 1797, Thomas Cushing resumed publication of the Gazette, however no reason was given for the change, however since the change William Bentley's columns were never published again, most likely due to political tensions between Cushing and Carleton.

In 1822, Thomas Cushing left the paper due to poor health to Caleb Cushing and Ferdinand Andrews, and died on September 28, 1824 at the age of 60. He was from Hingham, MA.

In , Caleb Cushing left the paper to Ferdinand Andrews alone, until he sold his interest in it to Caleb Foote.

In 2006 the Salem Gazette was resurrected under the banner of GateHouse Media, and currently operates as a free weekly newspaper focusing on culture, daily life and human interest in Salem. New editions of the paper are distributed on Fridays. The paper prints approximately 13,000 copies per week. The first editor of the new Salem Gazette was Bill Woolley.

History
The Salem Mercury was a newspaper that was published by John Dabney and Thomas Cushing. It began production around 1786, and ended in 1790 after the name of the paper was changed. It printed weekly on Tuesday onto demy sheet, four columns to a page, and predominantly on Long Primer type. Editors took great care in ensuring the intellectual quality of the content published. The editors were ardent friends to the Union of the States, and advocates for the Constitution.

The  on October 13, 20, and 27 of 1789 had no publisher's, editor's, or printer's names. The edition on the 27th contained an advertisement stating that the partnership of Dabney and Cushing was dissolved on the 14th, and another stating that the business was to be carried on by Thomas Cushing.

The first paper then issued by Cushing in 1790 had the title The American Eagle, and was designated as "Number 1, in 1790." The next paper was entitled "The Salem Gazette, Number 2 in 1790." This numbering pattern and name continued until the beginning of 1791, where the numbering was changed to contain the full number of issues since the first number of the Mercury. The name Salem Gazette continues to this day.

See also
 The Essex Gazette'', Salem's first newspaper
 Samuel Hall, first printer and newspaper editor of Salem

References

External links
Wicked Local Salem / News from the Salem Gazette. Published by GateHouse Media of Perinton, New York

Newspapers published in Massachusetts
Salem, Massachusetts
Mass media in Essex County, Massachusetts
Gannett publications